This page provides supplementary chemical data on ethanol.

Material Safety Data Sheet  

External MSDS

Structure and properties

Thermodynamic properties

Spectral data

Vapor pressure of liquid

Density of ethanol at various temperatures
Data obtained from 

These data correlate as ρ [g/cm3] = −8.461834 T [°C] + 0.8063372 with an R2 = 0.99999.

Properties of aqueous ethanol solutions
Data obtained from

Boiling points of aqueous solutions
Data obtained from CRC Handbook of Chemistry (Page 2117)

‡Azeotropic mixture

Charts

References

Chemical data pages
Data page
Chemical data pages cleanup